China University of Mining and Technology (CUMT), colloquially 矿大, is a national key university under the direct supervision of the Ministry of Education of China, and a Double First Class University Plan, former Project 211 and Project 985 platform (in terms of mining) university of China. It is a Chinese state Double First Class University. The university is ranked as the best mining university in China and has a worldwide reputation in coal mining technology and research.

China University of Mining and Technology has two individual entities: the main entity is located in Xuzhou, Jiangsu province, which is called the China University of Mining and Technology (CUMT), and a second entity is located in Beijing, known as the China University of Mining and Technology, Beijing (CUMTB). The latter used to be the Graduate School of CUMT. CUMT is a leading multi-disciplinary polytechnic university with mining features.

History

The Jiaozuo School of Railroad and Mines, the predecessor of the university, was established in 1909. After moving from Jiaozuo to Tianjin in 1950, the school changed its name to the China Institute of Mining and Technology (CIMT). In 1952, during the nationwide restructuring of universities and colleges, the mining engineering departments of Tsinghua University, former Beiyang University and the Tangshan Institute of Railroad were merged into CIMT. In 1953, CIMT was moved to Beijing and became the Beijing Institute of Mining and Technology; in 1970, the institute was moved to Sichuan province and renamed the Sichuan Institute of Mining and Technology. In 1978, the institute was moved to the present new location in Xuzhou, Jiangsu province and restored its original name, CIMT. In the same year, the Beijing Graduate School of CIMT was founded and began to admit graduate students. In 1988, the institute was renamed the China University of Mining and Technology (CUMT). In 1997, the CUMT Beijing branch was founded based on the Beijing Graduate School of CUMT and began to admit undergraduate students. CUMT was approved as one of key universities in China by the government in 1960 and in 1978 respectively. In February 2000, CUMT was transferred to be under the administration of China's Ministry of Education from the administration of China's Ministry of Coal Mining and became one of the state universities directly supervised by the Ministry of Education.

In 2003, CUMT was approved to be separated into the China University of Mining and Technology (CUMT) and the China University of Mining and Technology, Beijing (CUMTB).

References

External links

CUMT home page
CUMTB home page
A New Introduction to CUMT, Jiangsu Province
CUMT Alumni Association in Canada Home Page

 
1909 establishments in China
Educational institutions established in 1909
Plan 111
Universities and colleges in Beijing
Universities and colleges in Jiangsu